Frei.Wild (pronounced FRY-vilt, the word Frei translates to "free" and the word Wild translates to "wild")  is a German rock band from Brixen, South Tyrol, Italy. Its members belong to the German-speaking population of South Tyrol and their songs are mostly in German.

History 
The band was founded by Philipp Burger (vocals, guitar) and Jonas Notdurfter (guitar) in September 2001. Jochen Gargitter (bass) and Christian Fohrer (drums) joined the band shortly after. In the beginning the band tried to imitate other German-speaking bands like Böhse Onkelz and Rammstein. In 2002 their first album Eines Tages was released, followed by Wo die Sonne wieder lacht in 2003. Their third album Mensch oder Gott was released in 2004 and their fourth Mitten ins Herz after the band changed the label in 2006. In 2007 the live DVD Von Nah und Fern was released, followed by the studio album Gegen alles, gegen nichts in 2008. The album Hart am Wind was released in 2009 via the newly founded label Rookies & Kings. In 2010 the album Gegengift appeared, which reached number two in the German album charts and earned the band a nomination as Best National Rock/Alternative Group at the 2011 Echo Awards. The 2012 album Feinde deiner Feinde again made number two of the German album charts and was nominated for the 2013 Echo Awards. The nomination was withdrawn later on. In May 2013 the gold edition of Feinde deiner Feinde reached number one in the German album charts. Their ninth studio album Still contains acoustic songs and entered the German album charts at number one in December 2013.

.

Criticism 
The band is often associated with right-wing politics, despite the fact that its members have distanced themselves from all forms of political extremism in songs and interviews several times. Philipp Burger, Frei.Wild's singer, was part of the neo-Nazi band Kaiserjäger (Imperial Hunters) before founding Frei.Wild. Burger explained his engagement with Kaiserjäger as a youth folly, in a time where he was seeking rebellion. In 2008 he was associated with the right-wing party Die Freiheitlichen for several months. He denies that he officially became a member.

Their songs Südtirol (South Tyrol) and Wahre Werte (True Values) are often criticised as promoting nationalism. Südtirol contains the lines "Kurz gesagt, ich dulde keine Kritik an diesem heiligen Land, das unsre Heimat ist, (...) Südtirol, du bist noch nicht verlorn, in der Hölle sollen deine Feinde schmorn." ("To make it short: I don't tolerate any criticism on this holy country, that is our home, (...) South Tyrol, you aren't lost yet, in hell your enemies shall burn."). The chorus of Wahre Werte includes the lines "Wann hört ihr auf, eure Heimat zu hassen? Wenn ihr euch Ihrer schämt, dann könnt ihr sie doch verlassen, (...) Sprache, Brauchtum und Glaube sind Werte der Heimat, ohne sie gehen wir unter, stirbt unser kleines Volk" ("When are you going to stop to hate your home country? If you are ashamed of it, you can leave it, (...) Language, tradition and belief are values of the home country, without them we will perish, our small nation will die."). The band often defends these lines by pointing out the history of the German population in South Tyrol, explaining that the lines must be understood in the context of italianization.

Frei.Wild were nominated for the 2013 Echo Awards as Best National Rock/Alternative Group for their album Feinde deiner Feinde, based on the number of records they had sold. Kraftklub and MIA., who were nominated in the same category, protested in response and asked to be removed from the nomination list. In reaction, Frei.Wild were excluded from the awards in order to avoid that the event would be overshadowed by a political debate.In February 2014, Frei.Wild were nominated as Best National Rock/Alternative Group for the 2014 Echo Awards again due to the commercial success of the album Still. An ethical review committee, which had been created by the Echo's organizers in response to the public criticism to Frei.Wild's nomination in 2013, approved the band.

Discography

Albums

Studio albums 
 Eines Tages (2002)
 Wo die Sonne wieder lacht (2003)
 Mensch oder Gott (2004)
 Mitten ins Herz (2006)
 Gegen alles, gegen nichts (2008)
 Hart am Wind (2009)
 Gegengift (2010)
 Feinde deiner Feinde (2012)
 Still (2013)
 Opposition (2015)
 15 Jahre Deutschrock & SKAndale (2016)
 Rivalen und Rebellen (2018)
 Still II (2019)
 Corona Quarantäne Tape (2020)
 Corona Tape II (2020)
 20 Jahre, Wir schaffen Deutsch.Land (2021)

Live albums 
 Von nah und fern (2007)
 Händemeer (2011)
 Die Welt brennt – Live in Stuttgart (2012)
 Auf stiller Fahrt (2014)
 Live in Frankfurt: Unfassbar, unvergleichbar, unvergesslich (2014)
 15 Jahre mit Liebe, Stolz & Leidenschaft (2016)
 Rivalen und Rebellen – Live & More (2018)

Singles 
 Das Land der Vollidioten (2009)
 Sieger stehen da auf, wo Verlierer liegen bleiben (2010)
 Dieses Jahr holen wir uns den Pokal (2010)
 Allein nach vorne (2010)
 Weil du mich nur verarscht hast (2011)
 Feinde deiner Feinde (2012)
 Tot und doch am Leben (2012)
 Mach dich auf (2012)
 Wer nichts weiß, wird alles glauben (2012)
 Zieh mit den Göttern (2012)
 Unendliches Leben (2012)
 Verdammte Welt (2013)
 Stille Nacht (2013)
 Wir brechen eure Seelen (2014)
 Unvergessen, unvergänglich, lebenslänglich (2015)
 Wie ein schützender Engel (2015)
 Macht euch endlich alle platt (2017)
 Rivalen und Rebellen (2017)
 Antiwillkommen (2017)
 Herz schlägt Herz (2017)
 Und ich war wieder da (2018)
 Der Teufel trägt Geweih (2019)
 Die Liebe mich zu hassen (2019)
 Sommerland (2019)
 Blinde Völker wie Armeen (2019)
 Keine Lüge reicht je bis zur Wahrheit (2019)
 Corona Weltuntergang (2020)
 Alles, alles was mir fehlt (2020)
 Wir gehen Dir ewig auf die Eier (2020)
 Nur das Leben in Freiheit (2020)
 Hier rein da raus Freigeist (2020)
 Renne, brenne, Himmelstürmer (2020)
 Ich weiss wer ich war (2020)
 Wo geht es hin wo bleiben wir stehen (2020)
 Engel über dem Himmel (2020)
 Spirit of 1996 (2020)
 Corona Weltuntergang V2 (2020)
 Krieg ohne Sieger (2021)
 Frohe Weihnacht, Buon Natale, Merry Christmas (2021)

Awards

References

External links 

 

Italian hard rock musical groups
Musical groups established in 2001
2001 establishments in Italy
Culture of South Tyrol